The 2019 Betfred World Matchplay was the 26th annual staging of the World Matchplay, organised by the Professional Darts Corporation. The tournament took place at the Winter Gardens, Blackpool, from 20–28 July 2019.

Gary Anderson was the defending champion, after defeating Mensur Suljović 21–19 after extra time in the longest final in the tournament's history. However, he lost 11–8 to Mervyn King in the second round.

Rob Cross won his first World Matchplay title with an 18–13 win over Michael Smith in the final. He also became just the fourth player in history to win both the PDC World Championship and the World Matchplay.

Prize money
The prize fund rose from £500,000 to £700,000, with the winner's earnings being up from £115,000 in 2018 to £150,000.

Format
In previous stagings of the event all games had to be won by two clear legs with no sudden-death legs. However, after consulting the host broadcaster Sky Sports in 2013, the PDC decided that games will now only proceed for a maximum of six extra legs before a tie-break leg is required. For example, in a first to 10 legs first round match, if the score reaches 12-12 then the 25th leg will be the decider.

Qualification
The top 16 players on the PDC Order of Merit as of 30 June 2019 were seeded for the tournament. The top 16 players on the ProTour Order of Merit, not to have already qualified on the cut-off date were unseeded.

The following players qualified for the tournament:

PDC Order of Merit
  Michael van Gerwen (second round)
  Rob Cross (champion)
  Daryl Gurney (semi-finals)
  Gary Anderson  (second round)
  Michael Smith (runner-up)
  Peter Wright (quarter-finals)
  Gerwyn Price (first round)
  James Wade (quarter-finals)
  Mensur Suljović (second round)
  Ian White (second round)
  Simon Whitlock (second round)
  Dave Chisnall (first round)
  Nathan Aspinall (first round)
  Jonny Clayton (first round)
  Darren Webster (first round)
  Adrian Lewis (first round)

PDC ProTour qualifiers
  Krzysztof Ratajski (second round)
  Ricky Evans (first round)
  Glen Durrant (semi-finals)
  Joe Cullen (first round)
  Steve Beaton (first round)
  Stephen Bunting (quarter-finals)
  Jermaine Wattimena (first round)
  Jamie Hughes (first round)
  Jeffrey de Zwaan (first round)
  Chris Dobey (first round)
  Danny Noppert (first round)
  Max Hopp (second round)
  Mervyn King (quarter-finals)
  John Henderson (first round)
  Keegan Brown (second round)
  Vincent van der Voort (first round)

Draw

Statistics
{|class="wikitable sortable" style="font-size: 95%; text-align: right"
|-
! Player
! Eliminated
! Played
! Legs Won
! Legs Lost
! 100+
! 140+
! 180s
! High checkout
! 3-dart average
! Checkout success 
|-
|align="left"|  
| Winner
| 5
| 
| 
| 
| 
| 
| 170
| 98.14
| 43.90% 
|-
|align="left"|  
| Runner up
| 5
| 
| 
|  
|  
|  
| 147
| 97.61
| 38.42%
|-
|align="left"|  
| Semi-finals
| 4
| 
| 
|  
|  
| 
| 137
| 97.08
| 44.55% 
|-
|align="left"|  
|
| 4
| 
| 
| 
| 
| 
| 124
| 94.63
| 32.31%
|-
|align="left"|  
| 
| 3
| 
| 
| 
| 
| 
| 170
| 102.53
| 48.84%
|-
|align="left"|  
|Quarter-finals
| 3
| 
| 
| 
| 
| 
| 160
| 94.60
| 42.67% 
|-
|align="left"| 
|Quarter-finals
| 3
| 
| 
| 
| 
| 
| 120
| 93.97
| 39.71% 
|-
|align="left"|  
|
| 3
| 
| 
| 
| 
| 
| 160
| 91.90
| 43.42% 
|-
|align="left"|  
|Second round
| 2
| 
| 
| 
| 
| 
| 121
| 96.44
| 32.35% 
|-
|align="left"|  
|Second round
| 2
| 
| 
| 
| 
| 
| 134
| 95.84
| 32.81% 
|-
|align="left"|  
|
| 2
| 
| 
| 
| 
| 
| 101
| 94.84
| 42.00% 
|-
|align="left"|  
|Second round
| 2
| 
| 
| 
| 
| 
| 160
| 94.35
| 35.29% 
|-
|align="left"|  
|Second round
| 2
| 
| 
| 
| 
| 
| 148
| 94.02
| 40.43% 
|-
|align="left"|  
|Second round
| 2
| 
| 
| 
| 
| 
| 128
| 93.85
| 42.86% 
|-
|align="left"| 
|Second round
| 2
| 
| 
| 
| 
| 
| 160
| 91.84
| 45.45% 
|-
|align="left"|  
|Second round
| 2
| 
| 
| 
| 
| 
| 124
| 91.21
| 46.15%
|-
|align="left"| 
| 
| 1
| 5
| 10
| 17
| 3
| 4
| 127
| 102.96
| 26.32% 
|-
|align="left"|  
| 
| 1
| 8
| 10
| 24
| 16
| 4
| 97
| 101.33
| 47.06%
|-
|align="left"|  Dave Chisnall
| First round
| 1
| 9
| 11
| 26
| 9
| 10
| 81
| 97.69
| 29.03% 
|-
|align="left"|  Jamie Hughes
| First round
| 1
| 7
| 10
| 25
| 13
| 2
| 128
| 97.54
| 36.84% 
|-
|align="left"|  
| First round
| 1
| 5
| 10
| 21
| 12
| 2
| 52
| 97.40
| 31.25%
|-
|align="left"|  
| First round
| 1
| 12
| 13
| 28
| 21
| 6
| 119
| 95.26
| 37.50% 
|-
|align="left"| 
| First round
| 1
| 4
| 10
| 15
| 8
| 6
| 80
| 94.69
| 40.00%
|-
|align="left"|  
| First round
| 1
| 8
| 10
| 23
| 13
| 2
| 101
| 93.46
| 44.44%
|-
|align="left"|  Gerwyn Price
| First round
| 1
| 12
| 13
| 23
| 11
| 6
| 106
| 92.02
| 51.17%
|-
|align="left"|  Chris Dobey
| First round
| 1
| 3
| 10
| 17
| 5
| 2
| 145
| 91.34
| 33.33%
|-
|align="left"| 
| First round
| 1
| 6
| 10
| 22
| 6
| 4
| 46
| 89.86
| 35.29%
|-
|align="left"|  
| First round
| 1
| 7
| 10
| 20
| 8
| 2 
| 85
| 89.33
| 58.33%
|-
|align="left"| 
| First round
| 1
| 0
| 10
| 8
| 6
| 2
| 
| 88.63
| 00.00%
|-
|align="left"| 
| First round
| 1
| 5
| 10
| 18
| 12
| 1
| 105
| 88.61
| 33.33%
|-
|align="left"| 
| First round
| 1
| 6
| 10
| 16
| 10
| 2
| 86
| 87.77
| 31.58%
|-
|align="left"| 
| First round
| 1
| 1
| 10
| 9
| 3
| 3
| 32
| 82.02
| 14.29%
|-

References

World Matchplay (darts)
World Matchplay
World Matchplay
World Matchplay